Vietnam is one of the world's top ten markets for beer consumption, with an established indigenous beer culture that emerged during French colonisation.

Macro breweries
Vietnam's beer market is fragmented, with a range of breweries controlling different market segments in different areas of the country.

The most dominant with 43% market share is Sabeco Brewery, which produces a portfolio of lagers (notably the Bia Saigon range and 333 Beer), and is strongest in the south of the country. Heineken N.V. (producing their eponymous beer Heineken, Tiger Beer and historic domestic brand Larue, Habeco (based in the north of Vietnam, producing Hanoi Beer, and Carlsberg Group (which is best known for Huda Beer, control 25%, 15% and 8% of the national beer market respectively.

Despite being one of its most popular markets, Heineken delayed launching their non-alcoholic "Heineken 0.0" beer for four years in Vietnam, launching it with a major marketing campaign in early 2020.

Vietnam's beer output increased from 3.4 billion litres in 2015 to 4.4 billion litres in 2019.

Imported beers
Vietnam imports beers from various countries.  Belgian bottled beers include Trappiste, Chimay, Leffe, Hoegaarden. Some examples of German/Austrian bottled beers that Vietnam imports include Münchner Hofbräu, Warsteiner, Paulaner, Bitburger, Edelweiss, and Köstritzer. Beers from Russia and the Czech Republic are also imported to Vietnam.

Microbreweries and craft beer
Vietnam's craft beer scene is rapidly growing: out of 98 active breweries in Vietnam, the majority are independently owned microbreweries.

A range of smaller microbreweries were formed in the 1990s, as Vietnamese studying or working abroad returned with enthusiasm for European beer styles like Czech pilsners and German wheat beers.

The second wave of microbreweries emerged in the mid 2010s. The first to launch commercially was Platinum, a Ho Chi Minh City based brewery producing Australian styles of ales. Since then, a range of other craft breweries have launched who now produce commercial quantities and distribute both domestically and internationally.

Notable examples of Vietnamese breweries that have expanded onto the international stage include Pasteur Street Brewing Company (which operates a nationwide chain of taprooms), Heart of Darkness (which is among the most active exporters to countries like Hong Kong & Singapore), and East West Brewing Company.

Other notable breweries around Vietnam include 7 Bridges Brewing (Danang & Hanoi), Furbrew (Hanoi), Turtle Lake Brewing Company (Hanoi) and Winking Seal (Ho Chi Minh City).

Gallery

References

 
Economy of Vietnam